Gengaraj Kola (also Romanized as Genkaraj Kolā; also known as Gangaraj Kalā, Gangar Kolā, Gengerej Kolā, and Kangaraj Kalā) is a village in Chelav Rural District, in the Central District of Amol County, Mazandaran Province, Iran. At the 2006 census, its population was 80, in 31 families.

References 

Populated places in Amol County